Emilcin  is a village in the administrative district of Gmina Opole Lubelskie, within Opole Lubelskie County, Lublin Voivodeship, in eastern Poland.

One can find there the only UFO-related memorial in Poland, commemorating an alleged alien abduction.

References

Villages in Opole Lubelskie County